Knaresborough Hay Park Lane railway station was a temporary railway station that served the town of Knaresborough, North Yorkshire, England from 1848 to 1851 on the Harrogate line.

History 
The station opened on 30 October 1848 by the East and West Yorkshire Junction Railway. It was situated at the bridge over Park Lane in Knaresborough. The first train to depart the temporary terminus was on 13 July 1848, although the line and station opened on 30 October 1848. The temporary terminus closed on the same day.

References

External links 

Disused railway stations in North Yorkshire
Former North Eastern Railway (UK) stations
Railway stations in Great Britain opened in 1848
Railway stations in Great Britain closed in 1851
1848 establishments in England
1851 disestablishments in England